The Lhasa River, also called Kyi Chu, is a northern tributary of the Yarlung Tsangpo River in the south of the Tibet Autonomous Region of China. 
The Yarlung Tsangpo is the upper section of the Brahmaputra River. The Lhasa River is subject to flooding with the summer monsoon rains, and structures have been built to control the floods. 
In its lower reaches the river valley is an important agricultural area. The city of Lhasa, named after the river, lies on the river. There are two large hydroelectric power stations on the river, the Zhikong Hydro Power Station (100 MW) and the Pangduo Hydro Power Station (160 MW)

Basin

The basin has complex geology and is tectonically active. Earthquakes are common.
The river basin is the center of Tibet politically, economically and culturally.
As of 1990 the population was 329,700, of whom 208,700 were farmers. 88% of the people were ethnic Tibetans.

Water quality is good, with little discharge of sewage and minimal chemical pesticides and fertilizers.

Course

The Lhasa River is the longest of the Yarlung Tsangpo tributaries.
It flows through the south of the Tibet Autonomous Region of China, and is a left tributary of the Yarlung Tsangpo.
The river forms where three smaller rivers converge.
These are the Phak Chu, the Phongdolha Chu which flows from Damxung County and the Reting Tsangpo, which rises beyond the Reting Monastery.
In its upper reaches the river flows southeast through a deep valley.

Major tributaries in the lower reaches include the Pengbo River and the Duilong River.
It enters the Tsangpo at a point where that river makes a sharp turn to the south, and which therefore seems to be a continuation of the Lhasa River.

Intensive melting of snow and glaciers starts in May, contributing 20–30% of the water. 
The bulk of the water is supplied by the summer monsoon rains, which fall from July to September.
There are floods in the summer from July to September, with about 17% of the annual runoff flowing in September.
In winter the river has low water, and sometimes freezes.

Fish population

There are abundant species of fish that are adapted to the clear and cool water.
The cool temperatures, with the upstream reaches above  freezing over at times, has the effect of delaying growth of fish such as Oxygymnocypris stewartii.
The Tibetan plateau has thin air and clouds, which combined with the clear water gives strong illumination from a full moon. 
This may affect the fishes' circadian rhythm.
In 2009 it was reported that fish caught in the lower reaches of the river had been decreasing slightly in size, probably due to increasing demand and construction of hydroelectric dams.

Settlements

The river valley is one of the main agricultural areas of Tibet. 
The city of Lhasa lies on its shore, and there are many Buddhist monasteries in the valley.
In 1416 the monastery of Chödra Chenpo Penden Drepung was built on the right bank near to the Neudzong fortress.
The ruins of the Sne'u rdzong fortress are on the left bank of the river, opposite the Norbulingka summer palace of the Dalai Lamas in Lhasa.

The climate in the central river valleys of Tibet is comparatively mild. 
They are warm in summer, and even in the coldest months of winter the temperature is above freezing on sunny days.
A visitor described the valley around Lhasa in 1889 as follows,

William Montgomery McGovern wrote in To Lhasa in Disguise (1924) that the right tributary of the Lhasa River, the Ti, which enters the river a few miles below Lhasa, was crossed by a very large and imposing bridge over a hundred yards long, with masonry piers and substantial stone embankments.
McGovern also described the Yutok-sampa, or Turquoise Bridge, a structure with walls and a roof that crossed what had been the main Lhasa River but was now a stagnant canal.
As late as 1984 kowas, yak hide boats similar to coracles, were being used to ferry passengers across the Lhasa River.

The Liuwu Bridge was constructed across the Lhasa River to link central Lhasa to Lhasa railway station on the south bank.
The  bridge was completed in 2007.
In 2010 there was a small hydroelectric power station.
Prior to 2011, waste water from Lhasa was discharged untreated into the river. 
A waste water treatment plant designed to process 50,000 tons of sewage per day was commissioned in July 2011.

Barrages

Before the Annexation of Tibet by the People's Republic of China, the agricultural engineer Peter Aufschnaiter designed a dam on the Lhasa River to protect the palace of Norbulingka in the city of Lhasa from flooding, with a water supply canal to the city. Heinrich Harrer monitored the work.

Harrer directed a work crew of 500 soldiers and 1,000 laborers paid by the government of Tibet. 
A fleet of 40 Yak skin boats were used to carry granite blocks extracted from a quarry upstream of the Norbulingka.
Harrer mentions some difficulties.
The Tibetans did not work as hard as westerners, and would stop to help worms when they found them. There were several hundred women working on the site. 
The soldiers did not fail to make jokes with them, to which they responded promptly.
The site was often visited by members of the Tibetan government, who would give out silk scarves, and rewards were distributed to the workers.

The total hydropower potential of the river basin is 2,560,000 kW.
83 medium and small hydroelectric plants had been built by 1989, delivering a total of 26,124 kW.
Construction of the Zhikong Hydro Power Station in Maizhokunggar County began in May 2003.
The project cost 1.37 billion yuan. The dam impounds  of water. The 100 MW power station came into operation in September 2007.

The Pondo Water-Control Project dammed the Lhasa River in Lhünzhub County. Work started in 2008, and progressed on schedule.
The project includes a reservoir and a power station with potential annual generating capacity of 599 million kilowatt hours.
The project, also called the Pangduo hydro project, impounds  of water.
It is planned to irrigate .
Damming of the river stream was completed in October 2011.
The project was due to start operating its first generator in October 2013. 
The project involved a total investment of 4.569 billion yuan, or about 0.74 billion US dollars, and has been called the "Tibetan Three Gorges". It was built as part of the Western Development Strategy. The dam also supports flood prevention and water supply.

References

Sources

 
 

Rivers of Lhasa
Tributaries of the Brahmaputra River
Braided rivers in China